Phadeppa Dareppa Chaugule a.k.a. P.D Chaugule (1902–1958) was India's first Olympic marathon runner. He represented India in the 1920 Summer Olympics in Antwerp, and finished 19th with a timing of 2 hours 50 minutes 45.2 seconds. He hailed from the town of Belgaum in Karnataka.

Biography

He was born in 1902 or 1905 (no exact records available). His family had a business connected with Printing Press and an agriculture land. PD Chaugule was educated in vernacular (Kannada) medium up to 6th grade and he belonged to Belgaum, Karnataka (then in Bombay Province)

At the beginning of his career he enjoyed wrestling. He even took part in bouts in Akhada (arena), but he injured his arm and couldn't continue doing this sport. So he started running.

He was a strict vegetarian, which caused him a lot of problems during his traveling to England and Belgium.

Sporting career
In 1919 he took part  in the National Marathon organized by the Deccan Gymkhana Club of Pune (then Poona) and after that in some other marathons such as 10 Miles and 1 Mile events at the All-India Open Amateur Athletic Sports Meet in Mumbai (Bombay). He was the winner in all these marathons.
On 22 August 1920 he ran the Marathon in the Antwerp Olympics and since that point he became the first Indian Olympic participant.

The house of Karnataka's first Olympian, P D Chaugule is called as Pavananjaya. He received the title Conqueror of the Wind from the local community after on 7 December 1919, after the Antwerp Olimpics, where he was among the top-20.

He died in 1958.

A postal cover was released in 2003 to honour him, and the Chaugule Shield Cricket Tournament is organised by a local Gymkhana club every year in Belagavi.

References

External links
 

1900s births
1952 deaths
Athletes (track and field) at the 1920 Summer Olympics
Olympic athletes of India
Indian male marathon runners
Indian male long-distance runners
Athletes from Karnataka
People from Belgaum
20th-century Indian Jains